Thomas Michael Jager (born October 6, 1964) is an American former competition swimmer. He is five-time Olympic gold medalist in relay events, a two-time World Championship individual gold medalist for the 50-meter freestyle, and a former world record-holder in two events. Jager set the 50-meter freestyle world record on six occasions during his career. He held this record for over ten years from August 1989 to June 2000.

Swimming career
Jager attended the University of California, Los Angeles (UCLA), and swam for coach Ron Ballatore's UCLA Bruins swimming and diving team in National Collegiate Athletic Association (NCAA) competition from 1983 to 1985.  He won NCAA individual national championships in the 100-yard freestyle (1983, 1984), the 50-yard freestyle (1984, 1985), and the 100-yard backstroke (1985).  In 1984, he was honored as the Pacific-10 Conference Swimmer of the Year.

He was also an eleven-time United States national open champion.

Jager won seven Olympic medals for the United States. He won five gold medals in relay events. He also won an individual silver medal in the 50-meter freestyle in 1988, and an individual bronze medal in the 50-meter freestyle in 1992.

At the World Championships, Jager won gold medals in the 50-meter freestyle in 1986 and 1991. He also won gold medals in the 50-meter freestyle at the Pan Pacific Swimming Championships in 1989 and 1991.

Jager was inducted into the International Swimming Hall of Fame in 2001.

Coaching career
In 2004, Jager became the head coach of the University of Idaho's Idaho Vandals women's swim team. Jager then accepted the head coaching position for the Washington State Cougars swim team at Washington State University in 2011.  
He is now the head coach of the Aspen Swim club in Colorado.

Family
Tom is the youngest of a family of swimming siblings. While under a swimming scholarship at the University of Iowa, his eldest sister Diane was an All-American swimmer. His brother Bill qualified for Nationals while in high school and then went on to earn a full swimming scholarship at the University of Illinois. All three siblings went on to work as swimming coaches.

Tom has two sons, Wyatt (born 1996) and Cy (born 1999), both of whom swim for his swimming club, the Gold Medal Swim Club.

See also

 List of multiple Olympic gold medalists
 List of Olympic medalists in swimming (men)
 List of University of California, Los Angeles people
 List of World Aquatics Championships medalists in swimming (men)
 World record progression 50 metres freestyle
 World record progression 4 × 100 metres freestyle relay

References

External links
 
 

1964 births
Living people
American male freestyle swimmers
American swimming coaches
Idaho Vandals swimming coaches
Washington State Cougars swimming coaches
World record setters in swimming
Olympic bronze medalists for the United States in swimming
Olympic gold medalists for the United States in swimming
Olympic silver medalists for the United States in swimming
Sportspeople from East St. Louis, Illinois
Swimmers at the 1984 Summer Olympics
Swimmers at the 1988 Summer Olympics
Swimmers at the 1992 Summer Olympics
Swimmers at the 1995 Pan American Games
UCLA Bruins men's swimmers
World Aquatics Championships medalists in swimming
Medalists at the 1992 Summer Olympics
Medalists at the 1988 Summer Olympics
Medalists at the 1984 Summer Olympics
Pan American Games gold medalists for the United States
Pan American Games bronze medalists for the United States
Pan American Games medalists in swimming
Universiade medalists in swimming
Universiade silver medalists for the United States
Medalists at the 1983 Summer Universiade
Medalists at the 1995 Pan American Games
20th-century American people
21st-century American people